The Family of the Infante Don Luis is a 1783-1784 painting by Francisco Goya, now in the Fondazione Magnani-Rocca in Parma. Goya was invited to the Arenas de San Pedro estate near Ávila in mid August 1783 by Charles III's brother Luis of Spain, the portrait's subject along with his wife María Teresa de Vallebriga and their children.

See also
List of works by Francisco Goya

References

External links

1784 paintings
Portraits by Francisco Goya
18th-century portraits
Group portraits by Spanish artists
Paintings in the collection of the Magnani-Rocca Foundation